Amelia Muller Fay (May 21, 1844 – November 9, 1928) was an American concert pianist, manager of the New York Women's Philharmonic Society, and chronicler best known for her memoirs of the European classical music scene. A pupil of Theodor Kullak, Fay traveled to Europe to study with Franz Liszt. Her letters home from Germany, including descriptions of her training and the concerts she attended, were published in 1880 as Music Study in Germany. These memoirs include a comprehensive biographical sketch of Liszt.

Fay was born in 1844 in Bayou Goula, Louisiana. She was the third of six daughters and the fifth of nine children of the Rev. Charles Fay and Emily (Hopkins) Fay of Louisiana and St. Albans, Vermont. She was Charles Jerome Hopkins's niece. Her sister Rose Emily Fay married the conductor Theodore Thomas, and her sister Melusina Fay Peirce was the wife of the American philosopher Charles Sanders Peirce.

Amy Fay studied piano under Professor John Knowles Paine of Harvard and at the New England Conservatory of Music. From 1869 to 1875, she continued her lessons in Germany, where she studied with the most prominent teachers of Europe: pianists Carl Tausig, Theodor Kullak, Franz Liszt, and Ludwig Deppe. Deppe's technique for piano revolutionized her playing and served as the method she herself was to use for her students in the years to come.  On returning to Boston, Fay became well known for her "piano conversations": recitals preceded by short lectures. She moved to Chicago and New York, where she was associated with the Women's Philharmonic Society of New York. She died on November 9, 1928.

Bibliography
Music Study in Germany by Amy Fay, 1880; originally published by the MacMillan Company, 1896; reprinted by Watson Press, 2007. Edited by her sister Melusina Fay Peirce.
The Deppe Finger Exercises for Rapidly Developing an Artistic Touch in Piano Forte Playing (carefully arranged, classified and explained by Amy Fay), Chicago, 1890, Straub & Co.

References

External links
 
 
"Amy Fay: America's Notable Woman of Music", TheFreeLibrary.com.
"Amy Fay", AmericanMusicalWoman.WordPress.com.

1844 births
1928 deaths
American classical pianists
Chroniclers
Pupils of Franz Liszt
American women classical pianists
19th-century classical pianists
19th-century American pianists
19th-century American women pianists
People from White Castle, Louisiana
19th-century American women musicians